Asherton is a city in Dimmit County, Texas, United States. The population was 1,084 at the 2010 census, down from 1,342 at the 2000 census. The estimated population in 2018 was 1,064. U.S. Highway 83 runs through Asherton.

Geography

Asherton is located at the center of Dimmit County at  (28.447159, –99.761504). It is on the east side of El Moro Creek, a northeast-flowing tributary of the Nueces River. U.S. Highway 83 leads northwest  to Carrizo Springs, the county seat, and south  to Laredo.

Demographics

2020 census

As of the 2020 United States census, there were 722 people, 353 households, and 199 families residing in the city.

2000 census
As of the census of 2000, there were 1,342 people, 428 households, and 341 families residing in the city. The population density was 1,609.6 people per square mile (624.3/km2). There were 535 housing units at an average density of 641.7 per square mile (248.9/km2). The racial makeup of the city was 75.56% White, 0.15% African American, 0.15% Native American, 0.07% Asian, 21.39% from other races, and 2.68% from two or more races. Hispanic or Latino of any race were 94.78% of the population.

There were 428 households, out of which 42.8% had children under the age of 18 living with them, 56.8% were married couples living together, 18.5% had a female householder with no husband present, and 20.3% were non-families. 18.9% of all households were made up of individuals, and 11.2% had someone living alone who was 65 years of age or older. The average household size was 3.13 and the average family size was 3.62.

In the city, the population was spread out, with 35.2% under the age of 18, 7.6% from 18 to 24, 23.6% from 25 to 44, 20.8% from 45 to 64, and 12.8% who were 65 years of age or older. The median age was 31 years. For every 100 females, there were 87.7 males. For every 100 females age 18 and over, there were 83.2 males.

The median income for a household in the city was $20,417, and the median income for a family was $24,107. Males had a median income of $23,281 versus $17,500 for females. The per capita income for the city was $7,746. About 29.9% of families and 35.8% of the population were below the poverty line, including 40.8% of those under age 18 and 41.8% of those age 65 or over.

Education 

Public education in Asherton is provided by the Carrizo Springs Consolidated Independent School District.

Schools that serve Asherton include:
 Asherton Elementary School (PreK–6)
 Carrizo Springs Junior High School (7–8)
 Carrizo Springs High School (9–12)

Prior to July 1, 1999, the Asherton Independent School District served Asherton. AISD was forced to close because of concerns about taxation.

References

External links
 

Cities in Texas
Cities in Dimmit County, Texas